The Daryalyktakyr Plain, is an alluvial plain in the Kyzylorda Region, Kazakhstan.

The plain stretches across Zhalagash, Syrdarya and Shieli districts of Kyzylorda Region. A gas pipeline was built across the plain in 2012. The Shieli-Telikol Canal runs from north to south at the eastern edge.

Geography
The Daryalyktakyr lies north of the lower reaches of the Syr Darya and corresponds to an ancient channel where the river flowed.

It is a large, elongated takir zone to the north of the current river channel covered with a top layer of alluvial sediments of mixed sand and clay. There are some solonetz and solonchak areas, as well as some small lakes and swamps at the southern edge. The Karaozek river, a right tributary of the Syr Darya, flows westwards along the southern limits of the plain.

Flora 
Sedges may grow in the most barren-looking areas. Wormwood, Calligonum and tamarisk grow sparsely in dry channels.

See also 
 Geology of Kazakhstan

References

External links
Astragalus brachypus Schrenk ( family Fabaceae )
ПЕРЕХОД В ДРУГОЕ ИЗМЕРЕНИЕ НА ТРАССЕ ГАЗОПРОВОДА «БЕЙНЕУ—ШЫМКЕНТ» СВАРЕН ПЕРВЫЙ СТЫК
Plains of Kazakhstan
Syr Darya basin
Kyzylorda Region